Al-Faisal College (abbreviated as AFC) is currently the largest Islamic school in Australia with 2800 students. It is also a dual-campus independent Islamic co-educational primary and secondary day school, with campuses in Auburn and Campbelltown, both suburbs of Sydney, New South Wales, Australia. Operated by Al-Faisal College Ltd, the college was established in 1998 at the Auburn campus, later expanded to the Campbelltown campus in 2013 and Liverpool campus in 2015.

The college announced in 2020 that they will be opening up a fourth campus in Lakemba, with construction to start late November 2020.

History 
The Auburn campus opened on 27 April 1998 with 200 students from Kindergarten to Year 2. In 2007 the first cohort of Year 12 students, completing the Higher School Certificate graduated from the college. Between 2008 and 2018 the school more than tripled in size, from approximately 860 students in 2008 to 2800 students in 2018.

Al-Faisal College took over Iqra Grammar College at Minto, Campbelltown in 2013 with 440 students and 28 teaching staff bring the total number of enrolments to 1,660.

In July 2013, Al-Faisal College bought a  property in Minto where it planned to open a campus for 600–1,500 students by 28 April 2014.

In August 2013 the college's deputy principal for Years 7 to 12, Peter Rompies, said that school will likely not be able to cater for the 200 to 300 students on the "huge waiting lists" for Kindergarten 2014 applications.

Al-Faisal College Liverpool opened its doors in Term 2 on 27 April 2015 with two classrooms operating out of demountable classrooms. In 2016 the school received a $750,000 grant from the state government to improve the facilities.

Campuses

Auburn 
The Auburn campus serves as the headquarters for the school and is the largest campus by number of students and staff. The campus has five buildings, denoted as Building A, B, C, D and E. Building A is for the primary school, while Buildings B and C are shared between and primary and secondary students. Buildings D and E are used for secondary students.

The campus also has two main playgrounds, one on the main ground level, which is covered and shaded. The second is located on the rooftops of all buildings, except Building A. The rooftop playground is fully netted and secured.

The campus only has one main multipurpose hall, known as the "Upper Hall" among the school community, and as the "Grand Hall" formally. The Hall has an open stage, with backstage spacing, a comprehensive sound system and a projector system set up on stage. The Hall is used for sporting, prayers and school functions such as graduations, formals and awards night.

Campbelltown
The Campbelltown campus started operating under Al-Faisal College management in 2013, previously being operated by Iqra Grammar School since 2006. The campus went through a revamp under Al-Faisal College and hence has expanded its facilities to include a multipurpose hall, a library and multiple computer and scientific labs.

Liverpool
Al-Faisal College opened its doors to their third campus in Minto, Liverpool in 2015. The campus has seen rapid growth since its opening, with a four-stage plan to accommodate students from K–12. Currently, the campus only operates from K-11 and is expecting its first HSC examinations to take place for its first graduating cohort in 2022.

In 2020, Al-Faisal College announced their master plan for their Liverpool campus, which includes extending the existing campus and also creating another site for the school across the existing one, at 80 Gurner Avenue. This plan will create new facilities such as multipurpose halls, new play fields, extended library, new classrooms among other expansion projects. The plan will cater for over 5500 students and 200 staff and will cost more than $300 million to construct. The master plan is said to go hand in hand with the overall transformation of the Liverpool area, which is slowly becoming a CBD in Western Sydney.

Lakemba 
Al-Faisal College announced in early 2020 that a fourth campus will be constructed at 65 Croydon St, Lakemba. The campus will cater for 350 students from K-6 spread over a 2 level building, with associated car parking and play areas. The campus is due to open in 2022.

Curriculum
Al-Faisal College teaches according to the NSW Board of Studies, Teaching and Educational Standards mandated syllabuses. Students from Kindergarten to Year 12 study Arabic as a Language Other Than English and study the Quran and complete Islamic studies.

Students completing the Higher School Certificate at the college study Arabic and Islamic Studies, along with the compulsory subject English, and other subjects of their choosing. In the three years to 2019, Al-Faisal College increased its rank in the Higher School Certificate from 54th in 2017 to 23rd in 2020.

Primary students are offered compulsory courses of English, Maths, Science, HSIE, Technology, PDHPE, Creative Arts (includes Music and Visual Arts).

The college offers various co-curricular activities for Primary students such as computer science, programming. coding classes and  clubs hosting chess, debating and choir practise etc.

Funding
The Muslim World League (MWL), founded by Saudi Crown Prince Faisal, is closely linked to Sheikh Shafiq Khan, the managing director of the al-Faisal College.  The MWL provided funding to assist in the establishment of the college. While it has been reported that Khan's power rests on his close relationship with the Saudi Government and its Islamic Affairs Ministry, which uses the kingdom's wealth to promote its conservative Wahhabi view of Islam, in response Khan has said the Saudi funding of the school does not mean Saudis have control or influence on the college's curriculum.

In 2003, Shafiq Khan was involved in a court case where he was accused of diverting more than $1 million derived from halal certification to charities including the Al-Faisal College.  Khan negotiated a settlement and agreed to return the money.

See also

 Education in Australia
 Islam in Australia
 List of non-government schools in New South Wales
 List of Islamic schools in New South Wales

References

Educational institutions established in 1998
Private secondary schools in Sydney
Private primary schools in Sydney
Auburn, New South Wales
Campbelltown, New South Wales
Islamic schools in Sydney
1998 establishments in Australia